Gawłów  is a village in the administrative district of Gmina Sochaczew, within Sochaczew County, Masovian Voivodeship, in east-central Poland.

The village has an approximate population of 2,000.

Here was born Ambroży Mikołaj Skarżyński a Polish General who was the commander of a Napoleon's Imperial Guard squadron (Polish 1st Light Cavalry Regiment of the Imperial Guard).

References

Villages in Sochaczew County